Simon Corble is an English playwright, director and performer. He is the great nephew of Archibald Corble, the British fencer. He grew up in rural Oxfordshire, the son of a country vicar. The family moved north in 1974, and at the age of sixteen he played Hamlet at Lymm Grammar School, Cheshire and "never looked back". After training as an actor at Manchester Polytechnic (now Manchester Metropolitan University) he went on to create his own dramatic works. He has explored the potential of site-specific theatre in both his own works and those of others. On his website he writes that his strengths lie in "comedy, site-specific and promenade theatre, audio work, directing Shakespeare, and in creating unique theatrical experiences".

Writing
According to Tony Craze and Katie Brannigan, Corble writes "in obeyance of the unities of time and space – applying realistic and parallel scales between worlds of performance and real environment (short promenades for short distances traveled in a fictional world, careful allotment of time at each stationary point). Temporal and spatial settings for his work were seen to be of paramount importance. For The Woodlanders, this writer's research included close study of the North of England countryside, until focusing on a site with the largest, most remote wooded area, accessible only by a mile and a half trek."

Midsommer Actors' Company
Corble was the founder and artistic director of the Midsommer Actors' Company (1990–1999) which created open air site-specific theatre with the emphasis on the actor's performance. It moved indoors in 1997 to stage The 39 Steps, a play Corble co-wrote with Nobby Dimon which, proved to have a long life in theatres all over the world, with runs in London's West End and in Broadway. The adaptation, written for a cast of four actors and funded by a £1,000 Yorkshire Arts Grant, premiered in 1995 before an audience of 90 people at the Georgian Theatre Royal in Richmond, North Yorkshire, before embarking on a tour of village halls across the north of England.

Found Theatre
He created Found Theatre in 2005, with the aim of telling powerful stories through simple means.

Playscripts
The Woodlanders, 1991
Sir Gawain and the Green Knight, 1992 (a dramatisation of the 14th century Arthurian romance); it was originally written for The Midsommer Actors' Company in 1992 and played in eight outdoor venues.; Corble later substantially revised the play, which was produced indoors by Cardboard Menagerie at the O'Reilly Theatre, Oxford in February 2014.
The Wonderland Adventures of Alice
The Fisherman and his Soul, 1995-2007
The 39 Steps, 1996
Dracula, 1998
The Hound of the Baskervilles 
The Signalman, 2008
Operation Mincemeat, 2008 (based on the successful British deception plan of the same name in the Second World War)
Sward! – The Story of a Meadow, 2010

Notes

External links
 Found Theatre website
 Simon Corble's website

English dramatists and playwrights
English male stage actors
English theatre directors
Living people
Year of birth missing (living people)
Alumni of Manchester Metropolitan University
English male dramatists and playwrights